Arman Hovhannisyan (born 7 July 1993) is an Armenian football defender who plays for Ararat Yerevan

Career
Born in Yerevan, Hovhannisyan is a product of his native Pyunik Yerevan youth sportive system and signed first contract with this club in 2009. Subsequently, he played for another Armenian Premier League football clubs.

In July 2017 Hovhannisyan signed two years contract with the Ukrainian Premier League Zirka Kropyvnytskyi. He made his debut in the Ukrainian Premier League for FC Zirka on 16 July 2017, playing in a match against FC Karpaty Lviv.

On 12 February 2020, FC Tobol announced the signing of Hovhannisyan.

On 25 January 2021, Hovhannisyan returned back to his boyhood club and signed for FC Pyunik in the Armenian Premier League. On 30 May 2022, Hovhannisyan left Pyunik after his contract expired.

On 19 February 2023, Ararat Yerevan announced the signing of Hovhannisyan.

International
He made his Armenia national football team debut on 8 September 2019 in a Euro 2020 qualifier against Bosnia & Herzegovina. He replaced Kamo Hovhannisyan in the 83rd minute.

Honours
Pyunik
 Armenian Premier League: 2021–22

References

External links

 

Living people
1993 births
Footballers from Yerevan
Armenian footballers
Armenia youth international footballers
Armenia under-21 international footballers
Armenia international footballers
Armenian expatriate footballers
Armenian expatriate sportspeople in Ukraine
Association football defenders
FC Shirak players
FC Pyunik players
FC Mika players
Armenian Premier League players
FC Alashkert players
Ukrainian Premier League players
FC Zirka Kropyvnytskyi players
FC Ararat-Armenia players
FC Tobol players
Expatriate footballers in Ukraine
Expatriate footballers in Kazakhstan